Apollonopolis Parva or Apollinopolis Parva (Steph. Anton. p. 158), was an ancient town in Upper Egypt, in latitude 27° North, upon the western bank of the Nile. It stood between Hypselis (Hypsela) and Lycopolis, and belonged to the Hypseliote nome.

References

Cities in ancient Egypt